Herdis Kjerulf Thorgeirsdottir (born February 18, 1954, in Reykjavík, Iceland) is an Icelandic lawyer and political scientist who has specialised in human rights.

She was appointed a professor of law at Bifröst University in 2004; teaching courses in constitutional law and comparative constitutional law as well as courses in business and human rights. She has served on the board of trustees of the  Academy of European Law and represented Iceland at the Venice Commission. She was elected Vice President of the Venice Commission in 2013 and re-elected in 2015. In 2009, she was elected President of the European Women Lawyers Association (EWLA). She was re-elected for a second term in 2011.

She was one of six candidates in the 2012 Icelandic presidential election.

Bibliography
Thorgeirsdottir, Herdis (2005). Journalism Worthy of the Name: Freedom within the Press and the Affirmative Side of Article 10 of the European Convention on Human Rights. Raoul Wallenberg Institute Human Rights Library.
Thorgeirsdottir, Herdis (2005). Journalism Worthy of the Name. Martinus Nijhoff.
Thorgeirsdottir, Herdis (2006). Commentary on the United Nations Convention on the Rights of the Child: v.13: The Right to Freedom of Expression: Vol 13. September 29.

References

External links
Personal web page

1954 births
Living people
Herdis Thorgeirsdottir
Herdis Thorgeirsdottir
Icelandic non-fiction writers
21st-century Icelandic women writers
21st-century Icelandic lawyers
Academic staff of Bifröst University